Abundant Life Christian School (ALCS) in Madison, Wisconsin is a private Christian school. It is one of the largest non-sectarian private schools in the Madison area. ALCS was founded by Lake City Church (formerly Madison Gospel Tabernacle) in 1978 under the leadership of Pastor Warren Heckman.  ALCS was established to be a community Christian school and welcomes families from a variety of churches.  ALCS is a K–12 school which shares its  campus with City Church (a union of Lake City Church and Mad City Church)  and Campus for Kids, an infant to 4K child care center.  While the three ministries are closely related, the students and staff  represent over 50 churches and many neighborhoods in Madison and its surrounding communities.

Abundant Life Christian School and High Point Christian School consolidated in 2012 to form Madison Christian Schools - one school, two campuses.

Accreditation 
ALCS maintains accreditation as a K-12 school.  Currently, ALCS carries accreditation through the Association of Christian Schools International (ACSI).

Accreditation History for Abundant Life Christian School includes:

 Association of Christian Schools International (ACSI)
 North Central Association Commission on Accreditation & School Improvement (NCACASI)
 Commission on International and Transregional Accreditation (CITA)
 International Christian Accrediting Association (ICAA)

ALCS was one of the first schools accredited by the ICAA under the leadership of former principal David Wagner.

Awards 
 ICAA "School of the Year" 1996 and 2007

Community service 
Serve-a-thon is an annual even in which students serve community members and also solicit pledges.

The Abundant Life Christian School Chapter of the National Honor Society plans and implements service projects each year.  The ALCS Honor Society has received numerous awards for their service projects over the years.

Curricula 
A Beka is the primary publisher of curricula in the primary grades of the elementary department. Bob Jones University Press and A Beka texts comprise the heart of the curriculum for the upper elementary grades.

In the secondary school, many courses such as World Views and Bible have been developed by the staff.  Bob Jones University Press and other publishers' texts are also used.

External links 
 Abundant Life Christian School website
 Wisconsin State Journal March 9, 2009

References 

1978 establishments in Wisconsin
Christian schools in Wisconsin
Educational institutions established in 1978
High schools in Madison, Wisconsin
Private elementary schools in Wisconsin
Private high schools in Wisconsin
Private middle schools in Wisconsin
Schools in Dane County, Wisconsin